Balia, Bangladesh may refer to the following locations in Bangladesh:
 Bālia, also called Balya and Ballya, at 
 Bālia, at 
 Bālia, at 
 Bālia, at 
 Bālia, at 
 Bālia, at 
 Bālia, at 
 Bālia, at 
 Bālia, at 
 Balia, Chittagong Division, at 
 Bālia, at 
 Bālia, at 
 Balia, Barisal District, at 
 Bālia, at 
 Balia, at 
 Balia, at 
 Bali, also called Balia, at